Jan Olaf Roaldset (born 28 March 1946) is a Norwegian ski jumper. He was born in Molde and represented the club IL Hjelset-Fram. He competed at the 1968 Winter Olympics in Grenoble, where he placed 21st in the normal hill and 13th in the large hill.

References

1946 births
Living people
People from Molde
Norwegian male ski jumpers
Olympic ski jumpers of Norway
Ski jumpers at the 1968 Winter Olympics
Sportspeople from Møre og Romsdal